János Eilingsfeld (born February 5, 1991) is a Hungarian professional basketball player for Atomerőmű SE and the Hungarian national team. He participated at the EuroBasket 2017.

References

1991 births
Living people
Atomerőmű SE players
Forwards (basketball)
Hungarian men's basketball players
Sportspeople from Pécs
Szolnoki Olaj KK players